is a Prefectural Natural Park in northeast Mie Prefecture, Japan. Established in 1953, the park comprises one unified area that spans the borders of the municipalities of Kuwana and Kisosaki. In Heisei 16 (2004), nearly six-and-a-half million visitors entered the park, making it second in the prefecture, amongst its Natural Parks, to Ise-Shima National Park, and exceeding the number of visitors to Yoshino-Kumano National Park, Suzuka Quasi-National Park, and Murō-Akame-Aoyama Quasi-National Park.

To the northeast, the park adjoins  in Gifu Prefecture, a flood-control initiative following the 1754 Hōreki River incident, and now protected within Senbon Matsubara Prefectural Natural Park. Within the park, features of natural and cultural interest include Tado Taisha, the National Natural Monument Tado's Callery Pear Plant Communities, Japanese chinquapins, Gifu butterflies, and the remains of the landing of the  ferry crossing, between Kuwana-juku and Miya-juku, celebrated by Hiroshige in The Fifty-three Stations of the Tōkaidō, and designated a Prefectural Historic Site.

Gallery

See also
 National Parks of Japan
 List of Historic Sites of Japan (Mie)
 Tado Shrine

References

Parks and gardens in Mie Prefecture
Protected areas established in 1953
1953 establishments in Japan